Leopold III of Lippe (Paul Friedrich Emil Leopold; 1 September 1821 – 8 December 1875) was the sovereign of the Principality of Lippe reigning from 1851 until his death.

Early life and ascension
Leopold III was born in Detmold the eldest child of Leopold II, the reigning prince of Lippe and his consort Princess Emilie of Schwarzburg-Sondershausen (1800–1867). Being the heir apparent to the throne from birth he had the title Hereditary Prince.

He succeeded as Prince of Lippe on 1 January 1851 following the death of his father. A year after succeeding to the throne, Leopold was married on 17 April 1852 in Rudolstadt to Princess Elisabeth of Schwarzburg-Rudolstadt (1833–1896) the daughter of Prince Albert of Schwarzburg-Rudolstadt.

Reign
In 1854, Leopold issued two sovereign edicts. The first on 9 March, placed the Catholic Church on an equal footing with the Calvinist State Church of Lippe. The second six days later on 15 March, was to grant the same status to the Lutherans.

Lippe went through various changes during his reign. At his ascension, the principality was a member of the German Confederation, and Leopold supported Prussia during the Austro-Prussian War of 1866. Following the war and the dissolution of the German Confederation, Lippe joined the North German Confederation on its creation in 1867. Lippe would then remain a member of the North German Confederation until the creation of the German Empire in 1871 following the Franco-Prussian War.

Prince Leopold was one of the main promoters of the creation of the Hermann monument in the Teutoburg Forest which was opened by the German Emperor William I in the summer of 1875. A few months after the unveiling of the monument, Leopold died in Detmold. As Leopold was childless, his brother Woldemar succeeded him as Prince of Lippe.

The composer Johannes Brahms was a member of the prince's household between 1857 and 1859 as a conductor and music teacher to his sister Princess Friederike.

Ancestry

References

 

 
 
 

1821 births
1875 deaths
House of Lippe
Princes of Lippe
Lieutenant generals of Prussia